SK Olomouc ASO was a Czechoslovak football club from the town of Olomouc, which played four seasons in the Czechoslovak First League. It was founded in 1912 as SK Olomouc. The club's last top-flight season was the 1946–47 Czechoslovak First League, finishing in 12th position among 14 teams. The club ceased to exist in 1951.

Historical names 
 1912 – SK Olomouc
 1937 – SK Olomouc ASO
 1948 – Sokol Olomouc ASO
 1949 – Sokol OD Olomouc

References

Football clubs in Czechoslovakia
Czechoslovak First League clubs
Association football clubs established in 1912
Association football clubs disestablished in 1951
Defunct football clubs in the Czech Republic
Sport in Olomouc